Hans Huber (28 June 185225 December 1921) was a Swiss composer. Between 1894 and 1918, he composed five operas. He also wrote a set of 24 Preludes and Fugues, Op. 100, for piano four-hands in all major and minor keys.

Biography
He was born in Eppenberg-Wöschnau (Canton of Solothurn). The son of an amateur musician, Huber became a chorister and showed an early talent for the piano.  In 1870 he entered Leipzig Conservatory, where his teachers included Oscar Paul. In 1877 he returned to Basel to teach, but did not obtain a post in the Conservatory there until 1889; seven years later he became director. Among his notable students were Hans Münch and Hermann Suter.

In 1889 Huber wrote an A major symphony, which was conducted in December 1889 by Friedrich Hegar, and whose full score survives. He wrote in all nine symphonies, eight acknowledged, and several concertos, two for violin, four for piano, two of them effectively lost. During his last years he lived in Minusio in Villa Ginia. He died at Locarno.

Works
Huber's first symphony, in D minor, subtitled "Tellsinfonie" has a slight programmatic element, derived from the story of the Swiss national hero William Tell.  The symphony is somewhat similar in style and formal restraint to Brahms, although there is perhaps a foreshadowing of Sibelius in some of the orchestral textures.

Huber's piano concertos are slightly unusual for the form in that they have, like Brahms' second piano concerto in B-flat major, four movements (scherzos are included in addition to the usual fast, slow, and fast tempo movements).

Symphonies
 Symphony n° 1 in D minor "Tellsinfonie", Op. 63 (ca.1882)
 Symphony in A major, without Opus (premiered 1889 conducted by Friedrich Hegar), then withdrawn)
 Symphony nº 2 "Böcklin Symphony" "Sieh es lacht die Au'", Op. 115 (1897, premiered June 2, 1900, published 1901)
 Symphony nº 3 in C major "Heroic" for Soprano and orchestra, Op. 118. (ca.1908)
 Symphony nº 4 in A "Academic" in the manner of a Concerto Grosso (for 2 string orchestras, piano and organ) (1909)
 Symphony nº 5 in F major "The Fiddler of Gmund" (also "Romantische". Dedicated to Henri Marteau.) (Premiered February 1906.)
 Symphony nº 6 in A major Op. 134 (dedicated to Fritz Steinbach) (premiered November 1911)
 Symphony nº 7 in D minor "Swiss" (1922)
 Symphony nº 8 in F "Spring-symphony" (1920, premiered October 29, 1921 in Basel conducted by Hermann Suter)

Concertos
 Piano Concerto No. 1 in C minor, Op. 36 (1878; 4 movements)
 Violin Concerto No. 1 in G minor, Op. 40 (1879; 3 movements)
 Violin Concerto No. 2 in D minor, WoO (1886; 1 movement)
 Piano Concerto No. 2 in G major, Op. 107 (1891; 3 movements)
 Piano Concerto No. 3 in D major, Op. 113 (1899; 4 movements)
 Piano Concerto No. 4 in B major (1911; 4 movements)

Other orchestral works
 Roman Carnival, WoO (1879)
 Eine Lustspiel-Ouvertüre, Op. 50 (1878)
  Symphonic Introduction to the opera  Der Simplicius
 An das Vaterland (Symphonic Ode)
 Serenade No. 1, Op. 86, Summer Nights (1885)
 Serenade No. 2, WoO, Winter Nights (1895)

Operas
 Kudrun (Opera in 3 acts, Libretto by Stephan Born, premiered January 29, 1896)
 Frutta di mare (Libretto by Fritz Karmin, 1913)
 Die schöne Belinda (Libretto by Gian Bundi, 1916)

Stage music
 Musik zu einem Festspiele (Text by Rudolf Wackernagel, 1892)
 Der Basler Bund 1501 (Text by Rudolf Wackernagel, 1901)
 Der Weihnachtsstern (Text by Meinrad Lienert, 1916)

Oratorios
 Der heilige Hain (1910)
 Weissagung und Erfüllung (1913)

Masses
 Missa festiva in E flat (Kleine Einsiedler-Messe)
 Missa festiva in honorem Beatae Mariae Virginis D major (Grosse Einsiedler-Messe)
 Missa festiva in honorem Beatae Mariae Virginis F major (Male choir and organ)
 Missa in honorem Sancti Ursi
 Eine Fest-Messe

Cantatas
 Aussöhnung (Male choir, soloists and orchestra, 1879)
 Pandora (Mixed choir, soprano and orchestra, 1883)
 Caenis (Male choir, alto and orchestra, 1890)
 Heldenehren (Male choir, boys' or female choir, soprano, baritone and orchestra, 1909-1913)
 Kantate zum Jubiläum der Universität Basel (mixed choir, male choir, boys' choir, soloists, orchestra and organ, 1910)
 Meerfahrt (Ode for male choir, soloist and orchestra)

Other choral works
 25 Male choirs a cappella
 Serbian and Romanian Folk Songs for mixed choir a capella

Chamber music
 Quintet for Piano and Winds, Op. 136 (1920)
 Sextet for Piano and Winds
 9 violin sonatas
 4 cello sonatas
 4 piano trios
 2 piano quartets
 2 piano quintets
 Trio-Fantasia for Piano, Violin and Cello

Recordings
The Swedish label Sterling has released all of Huber's symphonies (except for the 1889 A major symphony noted above), some tone poems, and two of the piano concertos (nos. 1 & 3). There have also been several recent recordings from Huber's substantial output of chamber works, including at least one of his cello sonatas and three CDs (as of 2012) with violin sonatas of his; one of the early recordings of Huber's music was an LP of his first piano quartet "Waldlieder", with Hans-Heinz Schneeberger playing the violin.

Notes

References

External links
 Huber list of works at IMSLP
Description of the full score of the A major Symphony of 1889 at Basel Library

1852 births
1921 deaths
19th-century classical composers
19th-century male musicians
20th-century classical composers
20th-century male musicians
Male opera composers
People from the canton of Solothurn
Romantic composers
Swiss classical composers
Swiss male classical composers
Swiss opera composers
University of Music and Theatre Leipzig alumni
20th-century Swiss composers